A ceasefire is a temporary stoppage of a war in which each side agrees with the other to suspend aggressive actions.

Cease Fire or Ceasefire may also refer to:

Media
 "Cease Fire", the ninth song from Christina Aguilera's 2012 album Lotus
 Cease Fire (1953 film), a war movie directed by Owen Crump
 Cease Fire (1985 film), an American drama film directed by David Nutter
 Cease Fire (2006 film), an Iranian film written and directed by Tahmineh Milani
 "Cease Fire" (Star Trek: Enterprise), the forty-first episode of the television series Star Trek: Enterprise
 "Ceasefire" (M*A*S*H), the twenty-third episode of the first season of the American television series M*A*S*H

Other
 Ceasefire Canada, a peace organization based in Canada
 Cure Violence (previously CeaseFire), a public health anti-violence program
 Operation Ceasefire, a problem-oriented policing initiative implemented in 1996 in Boston, Massachusetts
 Operation Ceasefire (guns-for-tickets program), a guns-for-tickets exchange program that was run by the Denver Police Department